The men's team table tennis event was part of the table tennis programme and took place between August 22 and 26, at the Xinzhuang Gymnasium. Teams consisted of up to five members, but only three would compete in any given round. The thirty-two teams were divided into eight groups of four teams each, playing a round-robin within their pool. The top two teams in each pool advanced to the round of sixteen. The winner of each match progressed to the next round and the loser was knocked out. The winner of the finals won the gold medal, the loser won the silver medal, and the two losers of the semi-final matches both won bronze medals.

Each match consisted of up to five games, with the first team to win three being declared the winner. All matches were singles.

Competition schedule

Tuesday, August 22, 2017

Wednesday, August 23, 2017

Thursday, August 24, 2017

Friday, August 25, 2017

Saturday, August 26, 2017

Group round

Group 1

Group 2

Group 3

Group 4

Group 5

Group 6

Group 7

Group 8

Playoff Rounds

Round of Sixteen

Quarter-finals

Semifinals

Final

Final ranking

References
 Tapei 2017 Summer Universiade Table Tennis - Men's Team

Men's team